Narodnaya Shkola (School for the People) was a pedagogical fortnightly published in Saint Petersburg in 1869–1889. The journal's objective was providing the teachers, mostly in the Russian province, with the new methodological and theoretical materials, as well as keeping a general view on the state of school education in Imperial Russia. The magazine was edited first by Fyodor Mednikov (1869—1877), then by Vasily Yevtushevski and Alexander Pyatkovsky (1878—1882), then by Pyatkovsky alone. The best Russian practicing pedagogues and theoreticians contributed to Narodnaya Shkola, including Fyodor Rezener, Vasily Vodovozov, Vladimir von Boole, Nikolai Bunakov and Dmitry Semyonov.

References

1869 establishments in the Russian Empire
1889 disestablishments in the Russian Empire
Defunct literary magazines published in Europe
Defunct magazines published in Russia
Education magazines
Magazines established in 1869
Magazines disestablished in 1889
Magazines published in Saint Petersburg
Russian-language magazines

ru:Народная школа